The Stornoway Women's Suffrage Association was an organisation that campaigned for women's suffrage, based in Stornoway, Lewis in the Western Isles of Scotland, the Hebrides.

Hebridean women's lives 
The  association was formed of 25 women, from a community very different from the middle class London or working class factory women joining the big city suffrage societies, or the militant Women's Social and Political Union (suffragette) activities elsewhere in Scotland and across Britain.

Hebridean women were mainly heavy manual workers, physically strong women who gutted fish for the herring trawler industry, following the fleet locally, and travelling with other women from fishing villages around the coast of Scotland and Britain in the herring season.

Despite being disallowed to vote, many of the women made a significant financial contribution to the islands (£75,000 p.a. before the First World War). Others worked in crofting, in small plots growing crops and keeping animals, whilst their men were at sea. At that time, men contributed less to the islands' prosperity (£25,000 p.a.) than did the fisherwomen.

The notion of a woman's rights to work and travel was normal in coastal communities, making it a simpler case for equal franchise. The Stornoway Town Council supported the movement to give women the vote, before the Representation of the People Act (1918) made it real.

Women on the remotest island, St. Kilda (now uninhabited), were among the first to vote.

At the start of World War I, munitions factories recruited about 500 Hebridean women.

Women from the islands who were formally educated and went on to work internationally included Helen MacDougal, who became a doctor and radiographer in the Scottish Women's military hospital in Serbia during World War I, but was less celebrated than her brother

Society activities 
The SWSS, like others associations in Scotland, was affiliated with the National Union of Women's Suffrage Societies. Despite their rural setting, members spoke at public meetings, distributed fliers, and wrote articles in the local press to promote women's suffrage. Even prior to the formation of the society, they invited speakers such as Jessie Craigen from the better known suffrage movement in the larger cities.

Centenary production 
In 2018, the centenary of women's right to vote, the play Deeds Not Words was commissioned. Researched and written by Toria Banks and directed by Muriel Ann Macleod, with music by Mary Ann Kennedy, it toured the Hebridies with a cast and production team of local women and women from other parts of Scotland.

The play was sponsored by Rural Nations Scotland CIC and others to celebrate women's suffrage movements in the Hebrides, a hidden history of local engagement in the national struggle for women's suffrage prior to 1918. Director Macleod said:

Further reading 

 King, Elspeth (1978) The Scottish Women's Suffrage Movement. Glasgow. People's Palace Museum
 Leneman, Leah (1995) A Guid Cause: The Women's Suffrage Movement in Scotland. Edinburgh. Mercat Press.
 Leneman, Leah (2000) The Scottish Suffragettes. Edinburgh. National Museums of Scotland. 190166340x
 Pedersen, Sarah (2017) The Scottish Suffragettes and the Press. London. Palgrave MacMillan. 9781137538338

See also 

 Feminism in the United Kingdom
 List of suffragists and suffragettes
 List of women's rights activists
 List of women's rights organizations
 Timeline of women's suffrage
 Women's suffrage organizations

References 

Feminist organisations in the United Kingdom
Scottish suffragists
Suffrage organisations in the United Kingdom
Women's suffrage in Scotland